Jerry McGrath (25 December 1874 – 27 September 1932) was an Australian rules footballer who played with St Kilda in the Victorian Football League (VFL).

References

External links 

1874 births
1932 deaths
Australian rules footballers from Victoria (Australia)
St Kilda Football Club players
Collegians Football Club players